Szymon Tracz (born 12 November 1998) is a Polish road cyclist, who currently rides for UCI Continental team .

Major results
2016
 2nd Road race, National Junior Road Championships
2017
 1st  Road race, National Under-23 Road Championships
2018
 8th Overall Carpathian Couriers Race
2019
 1st Stage 2a (ITT) Szlakiem Walk Majora Hubala
2020 
 6th Overall Giro della Friuli Venezia Giulia
2021
 7th Grand Prix Alanya

References

External links

1998 births
Living people
Polish male cyclists
People from Skała
Sportspeople from Lesser Poland Voivodeship